The Truman and Sylvia Bull Coe House is a historic building in the Clintonville neighborhood of Columbus, Ohio. It was listed on the National Register of Historic Places in 2006. The house is significant for its Queen Anne-Eastlake style architecture. It is one of few remaining houses of the style or from the 19th century in the neighborhood.

See also
 National Register of Historic Places listings in Columbus, Ohio

References

Houses on the National Register of Historic Places in Ohio
1880s establishments in Ohio
National Register of Historic Places in Columbus, Ohio
Clintonville (Columbus, Ohio)
Houses in Columbus, Ohio